Tom Dreesen (born September 11, 1939) is an American actor and stand-up comedian.

Life and career
Dreesen grew up in Harvey, Illinois, a south suburb of Chicago. He attended Thornton Township High School there. While working as an insurance salesman in 1968, he met Tim Reid through a local Jaycee chapter, and the two teamed up as Tim and Tom, the first biracial stand-up comedy duo in the United States. Shortly thereafter they sought the assistance of radio personality Vince Sanders, who would coach the act and handle some of its business affairs for the next four years.

Though their material is now considered cutting-edge for its time, the pair struggled to make a living together and split up in the mid-1970s. However, each found individual success: while Reid landed a major role on WKRP in Cincinnati, Dreesen made appearances on Match Game and became a regular on The Tonight Show Starring Johnny Carson and toured with Frank Sinatra as the singer's opening act. 

In 1979 he supported the strike at The Comedy Store in West Hollywood. The strike was settled and the comedians performing there began to get paid; that year, he also appeared on Beat The Clock. In 1989, Dreesen released a comedy album through Flying Fish Records called That White Boy's Crazy. The album was recorded in front of an all-black audience in Harvey, Illinois.

Dreesen continues to perform today. He is also involved in philanthropic endeavors and hosts an annual golf tournament called the Tom Dreesen Celebrity Classic. In 2008, Dreesen, Reid, and former Chicago Sun-Times sportswriter Ron Rapoport collaborated on the book Tim and Tom: An American Comedy in Black and White.

On June 9, 2020, Post Hill Press published Dreesen's memoir, "Still Standing...My Journey from Streets and Saloons to the Stage, and Sinatra."

Dreesen has appeared in acting roles in the television series Columbo, WKRP in Cincinnati and Murder, She Wrote, and in such films as Spaceballs, The Rat Pack and Trouble with the Curve.

In 1999, a Golden Palm Star on the Palm Springs, California, Walk of Stars was dedicated to him.

References

Further reading

External links
 Tom Dreesen's official site
 'WKRP' vet Reid, standup Dreesen's previous life
 An excerpt from Tim & Tom: An American Comedy in Black and White by Tim Reid and Tom Dreesen with Ron Rapoport

1939 births
Living people
People from Harvey, Illinois
American stand-up comedians
American television personalities
Comedians from Illinois